The Sungai Besi–Ulu Klang Elevated Expressway (SUKE)  is a  three-laned, dual carriageway, controlled-access highway that is being constructed in Kuala Lumpur and Selangor, Malaysia. The expressway will run on top of the existing Kuala Lumpur Middle Ring Road 2 between Sungai Besi and Ulu Klang, with the intent of reducing traffic along the road.

Route description
The expressway begins in Ulu Klang, Selangor in the north, then runs above Middle Ring Road 2 to Ampang. The expressway then diverts southeast through Ampang Town, before turning back southwest through Cheras and Alam Damai. The expressway finally turns westwards to meet Middle Ring Road 2 again before terminating at Sungai Besi, where the road continues into the Shah Alam Expressway.

History
The increasing traffic along the  Kuala Lumpur Middle Ring Road 2 along the links of Ulu Klang, Ampang, Pandan Indah, Cheras, Bandar Tun Razak and Bandar Tasik Selatan facilitated the need for increasing road capacity. Prolintas proposed that the expressway to be built to meet these requirements. The expressway will act as an alternative route to Kajang from Ulu Klang. The project was allocated RM5.3 billion in the Budget 2015.

Features 
Elevated toll plazas.
Most of the highway is elevated, hence its name.
First road in Malaysia to have a helix ramp.
A rest and service area  at Tasik Tambahan

Incidents
There have been multiple reports of accidents happening related to SUKE during its construction period.

 September 20 2020 - A woman escaped death when a concrete slab fell onto her car from the elevated construction nearby Bandar Tasik Selatan. She broke her left arm and collar bone due to the accident and the contractors involved were fined RM180,000. The investigation discovered that the subcontractor did not follow the proper work procedures and also had a site supervisor with no accreditation.

 March 3 2021 - An overhead bridge under construction collapsed when a trailer hit the steel scaffolding the bridge nearby Bandar Tasik Selatan. The trailer however was not involved with the project and the driver was tested positive for drugs. The trailer was said to be overloaded when the accident happened. The director of Department of Occupational Safety and Health (DOSH) commented that the heavy trailer along with the low structure of the bridge caused the bridge to collapse when they hit each other. The accident led to two deaths and three injuries of factories workers in a van nearby the accident area.

 March 17 2021 - An accident occurred also nearby Bandar Tasik Selatan between two cars when one of the cars lost control and hit the other one. The car that lost control crashed into the pillar of the construction site of which the driver died at the scene while the other driver did not sustain any injury.

Tolls
SUKE adopts an open toll system.

Electronic Toll Collections (ETC)
As part of an initiative to facilitate faster transactions at the Ampang, Bukit Teratai and Alam Damai Toll Plazas, all toll transactions at these three toll plazas on SUKE are conducted electronically via Touch 'n Go cards or SmartTAGs beginning 15 October 2022.

Toll rates
There are three toll plazas, one under construction, along SUKE, each charging the same rate.

(Starting 15 October 2022)

List of interchanges

External links
Sungai Besi–Ulu Klang Elevated Expressway website

References

Prolintas Expressway Networks
Expressways and highways in the Klang Valley
Expressways in Malaysia
Proposed roads in Malaysia